Saoud Saeed Suhail Ali Mohamed Zahmi (Arabic:سعود سعيد سهيل علي محمد زحمي) (born 28 June 1990) is an Emirati footballer who plays for Ajman as a left back.

Career

Al Urooba
Saoud Saeed started his career at Al Urooba and is a product of the Al-Urooba's youth system.

Al-Wasl
On 4 June 2008 left Al Urooba and signed with Al-Wasl.

Al-Nasr
On 24 June 2013 left Al-Wasl and signed with Al-Nasr.

Ajman
On 1 August 2016 left Al-Nasr and signed with Ajman.

Al Urooba
On 8 August 2020 left Ajman and signed with Al Urooba.

External links

References

1990 births
Living people
Emirati footballers
Al Urooba Club players
Al-Wasl F.C. players
Al-Nasr SC (Dubai) players
Ajman Club players
UAE Pro League players
UAE First Division League players
Association football fullbacks
Place of birth missing (living people)